Anisur Rahman (born 1 March 1971, in Dacca) is a former Bangladeshi cricketer who played in two ODIs from 1995 to 1998. He also stood as an umpire in nine ODI games between 2014 and 2018, and in 13 Twenty20 Internationals between 2012 and 2018.

The early days
The tall left armer was successful with the ball in the U-19 Asia cup in 1989. There he took 3/44 against India, and 3/36 against Pakistan.

He was elevated him to the national squad. There, however, he struggled to hold his place, as Bangladesh already had two other left arm seamers, Gholam Nousher and Jahangir Alam Talukdar. Anisur's career was also hampered by injuries and No-Ball problem. Still, he briefly emerged in 1994, following the retirement of Prince and Dulu, as the country's top pace bowler.

International cricket
In the 1994-95 SAARC Quadrangular Tournament at Dhaka, (December 1994), he took 3/29 against Pakistan A, 4/29 against Sri Lanka A, & 3/28 against India A. In these matches, he used the reverse swing of the old ball with great effect. In fact, Anisur Rahman was one of the first Bangladeshi bowler to successfully use the reverse swing.

He played in 2 ODIs against India, but failed to impress. On each occasion, he suffered at the hands of  Sachin Tendulkar.

As an umpire
Rahman stood his first match as an on-field umpire in 2012 in a T20I match between Bangladesh and West Indies. In 2014, he stood his first ODI match as an umpire in a match between Bangladesh and Sri Lanka. He stood his last match as an umpire in the group match between India and Afghanistan in the 2018 Asia Cup.

 as on 26 October 2018

Retirement as an umpire
After the group match between Afghanistan and India in 2018 Asia Cup, he did not officiate any matches and quitted his umpiring profession for uncertainty of career under Bangladesh Cricket Board and settled in USA in order to pursue a better career in other profession.

See also
 List of One Day International cricket umpires
 List of Twenty20 International cricket umpires

References

External links
 

1971 births
Living people
Bangladesh One Day International cricketers
Bangladeshi cricketers
Barisal Division cricketers
Chittagong Division cricketers
Bangladeshi One Day International cricket umpires
Bangladeshi Twenty20 International cricket umpires
Cricketers from Dhaka